Al-Khandaq al-Sharqiyah is a Syrian village located in the Suqaylabiyah Subdistrict of the al-Suqaylabiyah District in Hama Governorate. Its population in 2004 was 737.

References

Populated places in al-Suqaylabiyah District